Evan Maurice Wolfe (November 5, 1922 – May 1, 2009) was a car dealer and political figure in British Columbia. He represented Vancouver Centre from 1966 to 1972 and Vancouver-Little Mountain from 1975 to 1983 in the Legislative Assembly of British Columbia as a Social Credit member.

He was born in Edmonton, Alberta, the son of Frank J. Wolfe, and was educated at the University of Alberta. He served in the Royal Canadian Air Force during World War II. In 1945, Wolfe married Phyllis Jeanne. He was defeated when he ran for reelection to the assembly in 1972. Wolfe served in the provincial cabinet as Minister of Finance and as Provincial Secretary. He died in 2009.

Wolfe also curled, and represented British Columbia at the 1959 Macdonald Brier.

References 

1922 births
2009 deaths
British Columbia Social Credit Party MLAs
Canadian male curlers
Canadian accountants
Curlers from Alberta
Curlers from British Columbia
Finance ministers of British Columbia
Members of the Executive Council of British Columbia
Politicians from Edmonton
Politicians from Vancouver
Royal Canadian Air Force personnel of World War II
University of Alberta alumni